The House of the Millions (Spanish:La Casa de los millones) is a 1942 Argentine comedy film directed by Luis Bayón Herrera and starring Luis Sandrini, Olinda Bozán and Héctor Quintanilla.

Cast
 Luis Sandrini
 Olinda Bozán 
 Héctor Quintanilla 
 Francisco López Silva 
 María Luisa Notar 
 Pedro Pompillo 
 Rodolfo Rocha 
 Sara Barrié 
 Celia Podestá 
 Salvador Sinai 
 Angel Boffa 
 Lea Briand 
 Francisco Petrocino
 Roberto Bordoni 
 Mariana Flor 
 María Goicoechea
 Pedro González  
 Rosario Granados 
 Elena Marcó

External links
 

1942 films
1942 comedy films
Argentine comedy films
1940s Spanish-language films
Argentine black-and-white films
Films directed by Luis Bayón Herrera
Films scored by Alejandro Gutiérrez del Barrio
1940s Argentine films